Jennifer Cassidy (born 13 May 1987) is an Irish writer, and tutor at the University of Oxford.

Background
From Dublin, Ireland, Cassidy attended secondary school at Wesley College where she completed her Leaving Certificate in 2005. She read history and political science at Trinity College Dublin, graduating with a first class honours Bachelor of Arts degree in 2010. During her undergraduate studies she spent a year at the University of Sydney researching gender and human rights. In 2011, Cassidy graduated from the University of Oxford with a Master of Science degree in global governance and diplomacy. She then undertook a Doctor of Philosophy (DPhil) degree in international development and digital diplomacy, receiving her doctorate in 2016. Her thesis was on the topic of digital diplomatic crisis communication.

Career
In 2011, Cassidy worked as a research assistant at CNN and as an attaché to Ireland's permanent mission at the United Nations. In 2012, she was a government and human rights attaché to the European External Action Service in Phnom Penh, Cambodia, before joining the Irish Department of Foreign Affairs as a political attaché. In 2016, she spoke at TEDxOxford. She has written for The Conversation, Grazia, the Business Post and has appeared on BBC News. She is the editor of the scholarly monograph series Brill Research Perspectives in Diplomacy and Foreign Policy.

Cassidy is a stipendiary lecturer at St Peter's College, Oxford. She is a member of the advisory council of the Centre for Feminist Foreign Policy.

Cassidy is an active Twitter user under the verified account @OxfordDiplomat, with a following of over 157,000 as of September 2022. Her social media commentary has been widely noted, including by Al Jazeera, The National newspaper, and The Daily Telegraph.

Bibliography
 Brill Research Perspectives in Diplomacy and Foreign Policy (series editor, 2017-2021)
 Public Diplomacy in the Digital Age (co-author, 2019)
 Gender and Diplomacy (editor, 2017)

References

Living people
Alumni of Trinity College Dublin
1987 births
Writers from County Dublin